Omchery N. N. Pillai (born 1 February 1924) is an Indian Malayalam–language playwright, novelist and poet from Kerala. He has written nine full-length plays, more than 80 one-act plays and a few novels. His plays are noted for their bold experiments in form and technique as well as the uncommon vision inherent in many of the themes. He won the Kerala Sahitya Akademi Award twice: in 1972 for the play Pralayam and in 2010 for his overall contribution to Malayalam literature. In 2022, he was honoured with Kerala Prabha Award, second highest civilian award given by the Kerala Government.

Biography
Pillai was born in Vaikom in Kottayam district of Kerala, on 1 February 1924, as the son of Omchery Narayanan Pillai and Pappikkutty Amma. He started writing poems at a very young age. After completing his education from University College, Thiruvananthapuram, he joined the news department of Delhi All India Radio in 1951 and later promoted as Editor in their publication department. He pursued his higher studies in Mass Communication from Pennsylvania University, Watten school and New Mexico State University and worked in the Indian Institute of Mass Communication.

After working in the Chief Censors Office and the Food Corporation of India, Pillai retired from the Central Service on February 1, 1989.  He later joined the Bharatiya Vidya Bhavan and worked there till December 2019.

Pillai wrote his first play Ee Velicham Ningaludethakunnu (This Light is Ours) at the behest of A. K. Gopalan who was then the Leader of Opposition in the Indian parliament. Members of Parliament K. C. George, P. T. Ponnoose, E. K. Imbichi Bava, V. P. Nair etc. acted in the play. Omchery has written nine full-length plays and more than 80 one-act plays. He founded the theatrical organisation 'Experimental Theatre' in 1963. DC Books published a collection of his 26 selected plays on 27 November 2011. Besides being a regular presence in Kerala's literary and cultural fields, Omchery is now the Principal of the Delhi Bharatiya Vidya Bhavan's College of Communication Management. He is married to Leela Omchery who is a well-known singer and sister of famous Malayalam singer, Kamukara Purushothaman. Leela Omcheri is from the Mankoyikkal Nair Tharavadu in Thiruvattar, near the Aadhikeshava Permual Temple. The couple has a son, S. D. Omchery and a daughter, famous classical dancer, Deepti Omchery Bhalla.

Works

Plays
 Ee Velicham Ningaludethakunnu
 Pralayam
 Cherippu Kadikkilla

Novels
 Pralayam
 Thevarude Aana
 Kallan Kayariya Veedu
 Daivam Veendum Thettiddharikkappedunnu

Awards
 1972: Kerala Sahitya Akademi Award for Pralayam
 2010: Kerala Sahitya Akademi Award for his overall contribution to Malayalam literature
 2013:  Pravasi Kalaratna Award
 2020: Sahitya Akademi Award, for Aakasmikam
 2022: Kerala Prabha, second highest civilian award of Kerala

References 

1924 births
Living people
Indian male novelists
Indian male dramatists and playwrights
Writers from Kochi
Malayalam-language writers
Malayalam-language dramatists and playwrights
Malayalam novelists
Recipients of the Kerala Sahitya Akademi Award
20th-century Indian novelists
20th-century Indian dramatists and playwrights
Novelists from Kerala
Poets from Kerala
Dramatists and playwrights from Kerala
20th-century Indian male writers
Recipients of the Sahitya Akademi Award in Malayalam
Kerala Prabha Award Winners